David Dodd (1895–1988) was an American educator, financial analyst and author.

David Dodd may also refer to:
 David Dodd (soccer) (born 1985), Australian football (soccer) player
 David Owen Dodd (1846–1864), American spy

See also
 David Dodds (disambiguation)